Gerben Wagenaar (Amsterdam, 27 September 1912 – Amsterdam, 31 August 1993) was a Dutch politician.
He was a member of the Communist Party of the Netherlands (CPN).

After the Nazis conquered the Netherlands, he became a member of the Dutch resistance.

1912 births
1993 deaths
Dutch communists
Municipal councillors of Amsterdam
Dutch resistance members